Coates  is a hamlet in Nottinghamshire, England. It is located 8 miles south of Gainsborough. on the west bank of the River Trent. The hamlet is within the North Leverton with Habblesthorpe civil parish.

Hamlets in Nottinghamshire
Bassetlaw District